The Men's Greco-Roman 97 kg is a competition featured at the 2020 European Wrestling Championships, and was held in Rome, Italy on February 11 and February 12.

Medalists

Results 
 Legend
 F — Won by fall

Final

Top half

Bottom half

Repechage

References

Men's greco-roman 97 kg